Ali Laarayedh (born 15 August 1955) is a Tunisian politician who was Prime Minister of Tunisia from 2013 to 2014.  Previously he served in the government as the Minister of the Interior from 2011 to 2013. Following the resignation of Prime Minister Hamadi Jebali, Laarayedh was designated as Prime Minister in February 2013. He is a member of the Ennahda Movement.

Laarayedh resigned on 9 January 2014.

Early life
Laarayedh was born in Medenine in 1955.

Political activism
Laarayedh was the spokesperson for the Ennahda Movement from 1981 until his arrest in 1990. After he was harassed by the police under President Habib Bourguiba, he was sentenced to fifteen years in prison under President Zine El Abidine Ben Ali, during which time he suffered torture. He was, among other techniques, threatened with HIV transfusion. His wife, Wided Lagha, was sexually abused and videotaped by officials from the Ministry of Interior. After being detained in September 2022, Laarayedh was arrested in December 2022 on accusations alongside others of facilitating the departure of Tunisians to fight with armed rebel groups in the Syrian conflict.

Career
On 20 December 2011, after President Ben Ali was deposed, he joined the Jebali Cabinet as Minister of the Interior. He vowed to support peace in Tunisia, rejecting religious extremism, tribalism or regionalism. On 22 February 2013, Laarayedh was appointed as Prime Minister after Hamadi Jebali resigned from office.

Personal life
Laarayedh is married and has three children. His wife is a medical technician.

References

External links 

|-

|-

1955 births
Government ministers of Tunisia
Living people
People from Medenine Governorate
Prime Ministers of Tunisia
Ennahda politicians
Torture victims
Tunisian Muslims
Members of the Assembly of the Representatives of the People
20th-century Tunisian politicians
21st-century Tunisian politicians
Interior ministers of Tunisia